Kim Schraner (born 1976) is a Canadian actress, who starred in the children's spy TV series Spynet, shown in Canada on CBC Television.

Schraner starred in the Showcase soap opera Paradise Falls as the character Jessica Lansing.
She starred in the pilot episode of T.R.A.X., which wasn't picked up as a series.
She's had appearances in various TV shows, including Mutant X, PSI Factor, Twice In A Lifetime, The Newsroom, and Due South.
She's also appeared in the TV movies Common Ground and The Hunt for the Unicorn Killer.

Early years
Schraner studied at the classical piano with The Royal Conservatory of Music.  She studied ballet through the Royal Academy of Dance programme.

Schraner started modeling for magazines and TV commercials at the age of 14.  In 1994 she was seen widely as the "Oxy Girl" in TV ads.  While completing her education, she appeared in several stage productions that included Waiting for Godot, Uncle Vanya, Top Girls, As You Like It, The Plague, and others.

Filmography

References

External links
Official web site (archived)

1976 births
Actresses from Toronto
Canadian film actresses
Canadian soap opera actresses
Canadian stage actresses
Canadian television actresses
Living people
The Royal Conservatory of Music alumni